Rural Canada has many faces and many dimensions (social, cultural, economic, etc.) but the common element of most conceptualizations of "rural" is the spatial dimension. Rural is primarily low population density, small population size, and distance from high population density and big size. Not surprisingly, the prevailing definitions of “rural” (in Canada as in most countries) emphasize this spatial dimension. Rural Canada is usually defined by measures of population density, population size and distance from major agglomerations.

In 2006, the year of the last census of population, the Canadian population living in a rural area was between 19% and 30% of the total population, depending on the definition of "rural" used.
Regions of Canada

Predominantly rural regions 
The OECD (1994) defined a “predominantly rural region” as having more than 50% of the population living in rural communities where a “rural community” has a population density less than 150 persons per square kilometre. In Canada, the census division has been used to represent “regions” and census consolidated sub-divisions have been used to represent “communities”. Intermediate regions have 15% to 49% of their population living in a rural community. Predominantly urban regions have less than 15% of their population living in a rural community. Predominantly rural regions are classified as rural metro-adjacent, rural non-metro-adjacent and rural northern, following Ehrensaft and Beeman (1992). Rural metro-adjacent regions are predominantly rural census divisions which are adjacent to metropolitan centres while rural non-metro-adjacent regions are those predominantly rural census divisions which are not adjacent to metropolitan centres. Rural northern regions are predominantly rural census divisions that are found either entirely or mostly above the following lines of parallel in each province: Newfoundland and Labrador, 50th; Quebec and Ontario, 54th; Manitoba, 53rd; Saskatchewan, Alberta and British Columbia, 54th. As well, rural northern regions encompass all of the Yukon, Northwest Territories and Nunavut.

Census rural 
This is the definition of rural used by Statistics Canada’s Census of Population. This definition has changed over time (see Appendix A in du Plessis et al., 2002). The current definition is a settlement with fewer than 1,000 or more population with a population density below 400 inhabitants per square kilometre (Statistics Canada, 2007).

References 

Geography of Canada